Peat Wax is a dark waxy substance extracted from peat using organic solvents.  It is very similar to the coal derived Montan wax and therefore has similar properties and uses.  Raw peat wax is typically a mixture of three primary components, namely asphalt, resins and wax.

References

Waxes